Farm to Market Roads in Texas are owned and maintained by the Texas Department of Transportation (TxDOT).

FM 2800

FM 2801

FM 2801 (1962)

FM 2801 was cancelled on May 25, 1966, and became a portion of FM 2626.

FM 2802

FM 2803

FM 2803 (1962)

FM 2803 was cancelled on May 26, 1964, and transferred to FM 1745.

RM 2804

FM 2805

FM 2806

FM 2807

FM 2808

FM 2809

Farm to Market Road 2809 (FM 2809) is located in Culberson County in West Texas.

The southern terminus of FM 2809 is at FM 2185 northeast of Van Horn. It travels north for approximately  before state maintenance ends. The roadway continues from this point as Whitehead Road.

FM 2809 was established on May 2, 1962, along its current route.

RM 2810

Ranch to Market Road 2810 (RM 2810) is located in Presidio County. It is the paved, state-maintained portion of the Pinto Canyon Road that connects Ruidosa and Marfa. RM 2810 comprises roughly three-fifths of the road's overall length.

The two-lane route proceeds to the northwest along the northern fringe of the Cuesta del Burro range of the Chinati Mountains. The road then emerges onto Ryan Flat approaching Marfa. In the city, RM 2810 turns north along South Hoover Street before reaching its northern terminus at US 90.

RM 2810 was designated on May 2, 1962, as a  route extending southwest from US 90 in Marfa.

FM 2811

FM 2812

FM 2813

Farm to Market Road 2813 (FM 2813) is located in Smith County, running near southern Tyler.

FM 2813 begins at an intersection with FM 2493 in Gresham south of Tyler and east of Noonday. The highway runs east through unincorporated Smith County before entering the Tyler city limits near County Roads 128/134. FM 2813 ends at an intersection with US 69 in southern central Tyler, with the road continuing east as Marsh Farm Road. For its entire length, FM 2813 runs closely parallel to Loop 49.

FM 2813 was designated on May 2, 1962, along the current route.

FM 2814

Farm to Market Road 2814 (FM 2814) is located in Gonzales County. It runs from SH 97 south of Waelder southward to the community of Hickston.

FM 2814 was designated on June 25, 1962, from SH 97 southward . On June 28, 1963, the designation was extended southward  to its current terminus at Hickston.

FM 2815

FM 2816

FM 2817

Farm to Market Road 2817 (FM 2817) is located in Wharton County. It runs from FM 1301 southeast of Wharton to FM 3012.

FM 2817 was designated on June 28, 1963, on the current route.

FM 2818

Farm to Market Road 2818 (FM 2818), also known as Harvey Mitchell Parkway, runs from SH 6 in College Station, northwestward to SH 6 and US 190 in Bryan.  This route is a western bypass of the cities of College Station and Bryan.  It runs through the Texas A&M University campus and next to the George Bush Presidential Library and Easterwood Airport.

FM 2818 was designated on June 28, 1963, from SH 21 southwest to FM 2513 (now Turkey Creek Rd., as the route was turned over to city of Bryan in 1989). On June 1, 1965, it was extended south to SH 6, replacing the section of FM 2513 from FM 2818 and Turkey Creek Road to FM 60 and Spur 135 from FM 60 south to the center of the Texas A&M airport. On August 31, 1967, it was extended north to SH 6. On January 27, 1988, it was extended from former SH 6 (former Loop 507, now Business SH 6) to new SH 6. On June 27, 1995, the entire route was redesignated Urban Road 2818 (UR 2818). The designation reverted to FM 2818 with the elimination of the Urban Road system on November 15, 2018.

In 2021, TxDOT began a project to widen Harvey Mitchell Parkway in College Station. Construction is expected to be completed in 2023.

Junction list

FM 2819

FM 2820

FM 2820 (1963)

On May 6, 1964, the road was extended west  to FM 1331 at Hare. FM 2820 was cancelled on July 27, 1964, and transferred to FM 1331.

FM 2821

FM 2822

FM 2823

FM 2824

FM 2825

FM 2825 (1963)

The original FM 2825 was designated on June 28, 1963, from US 183, 2.8 miles south of Goliad, south  to a road intersection. On November 5, 1971, the road was extended south . FM 2825 was cancelled on November 17, 1972, and became a portion of FM 2441.

FM 2826

FM 2827

RM 2828

Ranch to Market Road 2828 (RM 2828) is located in Bandera County in the Texas Hill Country.

RM 2828 begins at an intersection with SH 16 near Medina. The highway runs in a northeast direction before turning in a generally eastward direction. Just after an intersection with FM 3240, RM 2828 turns northeast before turning in a more northward direction. The highway turns back to the northeast before ending at an intersection with SH 173 just south of the Bandera–Kerr county line.

RM 2828 was designated on November 19, 1964, along the current route.

Junction list

FM 2828 (1963)

RM 2828 was originally designated as FM 2828 on June 28, 1963, running from SH 62 to a point  to the west. On May 26, 1964, the highway was cancelled and transferred to FM 2802.

FM 2829

FM 2830

Farm to Market Road 2830 (FM 2830) is located in Liberty County. It runs from SH 146 south of Hardin to US 90. There is a brief concurrency with FM 160.

On June 1, 1965, the road was extended south  to US 90, creating a concurrency with FM 160.

RM 2831

FM 2831 (1963)

FM 2831 was designated on June 28, 1963, from FM 1013 at Kirbyville to a point . On May 6, 1964, the road was extended northwest  to FM 1005 at Erin. On June 12, 1974, FM 2831 was cancelled and became a portion of FM 252.

FM 2832

FM 2833

Farm to Market Road 2833 (FM 2833) is located in Taylor and Jones counties that runs through northern Abilene. The highway runs near the eastern shore of Fort Phantom Hill Lake. FM 2833 is known locally as East Lake Road.

FM 2833 begins at an intersection with SH 351 approximately 0.5 miles northeast of I-20 in Abilene. The highway travels in a northward direction and passes by a housing development before leaving the Abilene city limits. FM 2833 passes by the Abilene Water Treatment Plant and the Abilene Police Training Center before re-entering Abilene near the FM 3308 intersection. A couple of miles north of FM 3308, FM 2833 runs near the eastern shore of Fort Phantom Hill Lake, passing by the Fort Phantom Marina and lakeside subdivisions before ending at an intersection with FM 1082.

On May 6, 1964, the highway was extended further north to its current terminus at FM 1082. On June 27, 1995, the section of FM 2833 from SH 351 to FM 3208 was redesignated Urban Road 2833 (UR 2833). The designation of this section reverted to FM 2833 with the elimination of the Urban Road system on November 15, 2018.

Junction list

FM 2834

FM 2835

FM 2836

FM 2837

FM 2838

FM 2839

FM 2840

FM 2841

FM 2842

FM 2843

FM 2844

FM 2845

FM 2846

FM 2847

Farm to Market Road 2847 (FM 2847) is located in Clay County.

FM 2847 is a shoulderless, two-lane route for its entire length. State maintenance of the roadway begins south of an intersection with FM 2606, which provides access westward to Lake Arrowhead, at an intersection with Gas Plant Road. The route continues northward and then eastward through unincorporated Clay County before ending at a junction with SH 148 south of Henrietta.

FM 2847 was designated on June 28, 1963, along its current route. The junction with FM 2606 was designated on November 16, 1968, when that route was added to the state highway system.

FM 2848

FM 2849

Farm to Market Road 2849 (FM 2849) is located in Montague County.

The western terminus of FM 2849 is at an intersection with Gray Road, near the defunct community of Red River Station. It travels to the east before reaching its eastern terminus at FM 103.

FM 2849 was designated on June 28, 1963, along its current route.

FM 2850

FM 2851

FM 2851 (1963)

The original FM 2851 was designated on June 28, 1963, from SH 199 north  to FM 1769 near Farmer. FM 2851 was cancelled on June 1, 1966, and became a portion of FM 2652.

FM 2852

FM 2853

FM 2854

Junction list

FM 2855

FM 2856

RM 2857

FM 2858

FM 2859

FM 2860

FM 2861

FM 2861 (1963)

The original FM 2861 was designated on June 28, 1963, from FM 156 in Krum north  to a road intersection. FM 2861 was cancelled on May 25, 1964, and transferred to FM 2450.

FM 2862

FM 2863

FM 2864

FM 2865

FM 2865 (1963)

The original FM 2865 was designated on June 28, 1963, from US 190 south  via Indian Village, replacing Spur 183. FM 2865 was cancelled on February 23, 1970, and redesignated as Park Road 56.

FM 2866

FM 2867

FM 2868

FM 2869

FM 2870

RM 2871

Ranch to Market Road 2871 (RM 2871) is located in Tarrant County, running from US 377 in Benbrook to I-30 in Fort Worth.

RM 2871 begins at an intersection with US 377 in Benbrook near Lake Benbrook. The highway runs in a generally northwest direction through eastern Benbrook, passing by several housing developments  before leaving the town near Aledo Road. RM 2871 is known as Chapin School Road in Benbrook. The highway runs through less developed areas of Tarrant County, passing under I-20 before entering into Fort Worth near Mary's Creek. RM 2871 runs as a two lane road in Fort Worth, intersecting with Spur 580 and passing near the All Saint's Episcopal School before ending at I-30. The highway is known locally as Longvue Avenue in Fort Worth.

On September 29, 1977, the section of highway between I-30 and White Settlement Road was cancelled. On June 27, 1995, the entire route was redesignated Urban Road 2871 (UR 2871). The designation reverted to RM 2871 with the elimination of the Urban Road system on November 15, 2018.

Junction list

FM 2872

FM 2873

FM 2874

FM 2874 (1963)

On May 5, 1966, the road was extended west  to RM 1800 (now SH 137). FM 2874 was cancelled on September 20, 1973, and transferred to RM 2401.

FM 2875

FM 2876

FM 2877

FM 2878

Farm to Market Road 2878 (FM 2878) is located in Bowie County. The highway is known locally as Pleasant Grove Road in Texarkana.

FM 2878 begins at an intersection with the westbound frontage road of I-30 near Nash and Texarkana. The highway travels in a generally northward direction and enters the city limits of Texarkana before turning east at Cooper Lane and runs eastward before turning back north at FM 1297 (McKnight Road)/University Avenue. FM 2878 resumes its northward direction, briefly running east between Chaparral Street and Constitution Drive. The highway runs north through the Pleasant Grove area of the city before ending at an intersection with FM 559, just south of Texas A&M University Texarkana.

FM 2878 was designated on June 28, 1963, running from I-30 to FM 559 along the current route. On June 27, 1995, the entire route was redesignated Urban Road 2878 (UR 2878). The designation reverted to FM 2878 with the elimination of the Urban Road system on November 15, 2018.

Junction list

FM 2879

FM 2880

FM 2880 (1963)

The original FM 2880 was designated on June 28, 1963, from US 259, 4 miles south of Omaha, southeast  to the terminus of then-proposed SH 77 in Naples. FM 2880 was cancelled on February 28, 1966, and transferred to SH 77.

FM 2881

FM 2882

FM 2883

FM 2884

Farm to Market Road 2884 (FM 2884) is located in Childress County.

FM 2884 begins at an intersection with FM 268 northeast of Childress. The highway runs north through unincorporated Childress County and turns northeast at County Road V. FM 2884 runs for approximately 3.6 miles before state maintenance ends and becomes County Road 19.

The current FM 2884 was designated on June 4, 1964, along the current route.

FM 2884 (1963)

FM 2884 was first designated on June 28, 1963, beginning at FM 2306 near Levelland and going southward to SH 116 (now SH 114). The highway was cancelled on May 21, 1964, and combined with FM 1490.

FM 2885

RM 2886

Ranch to Market Road 2886 (RM 2886) is located in Terrell and Pecos counties.

The southern terminus of RM 2886 is in Terrell County at RM 2400.

RM 2886 was established on June 28, 1963, from its current northern terminus (then signed as US 290) southward .

FM 2887

FM 2888

FM 2889

FM 2889 (1963)

The original FM 2889 was designated on November 20, 1963, from SH 7 near the Robertson County line north  to the Magnet Cove Barium Corporation plant site. FM 2889 was cancelled on August 2, 1968, and became a portion of FM 2749.

FM 2890

Farm to Market Road 2890 (FM 2890) is located in western and central Delta County.

FM 2890 begins at SH 24 in the unincorporated community of West Delta. The route runs east and then bends to the northeast before entering the community of Klondike, where it ends at FM 1528.

The first road appeared in the location of FM 2890 between the years of 1936 and 1940. This road followed the approximate route of FM 2890, and had a graded and drained gravel surface. By 1956 the road's surface had been improved to crushed stone. By 1964, the highway's surface had been improved to bituminous, a combination of crushed rock and asphalt. The route had also been minorly straightened. FM 2890 was designated on May 6, 1964, along its current route. The entire length of the highway was paved by 1987.

FM 2891

FM 2891 (1964)

The first use of the FM 2891 designation was in Wichita and Archer counties, from FM 1180 south and southwest  to a road intersection. FM 2891 was cancelled on June 14, 1965, and became a portion of FM 2846.

FM 2891 (1966)

The next use of the FM 2891 designation was in Morris and Cass counties, from FM 1400 (now FM 130) near Daingerfield northeast  to the Cass County line. On February 3, 1972, the road was extended east  to FM 161. FM 2891 was cancelled on September 21, 1973, and became a portion of FM 130.

FM 2892

FM 2892 (1964)

The original FM 2892 was designated on May 6, 1964, from US 281 east of Los Indios south  to proposed New International Bridge across the Rio Grande. FM 2892 was cancelled on March 7, 1969, and removed from the highway system; funds originally set aside for FM 2892 were used to construct FM 1561 instead.

FM 2893

FM 2894

Farm to Market Road 2894 (FM 2894) was located in Hidalgo County. No highway currently uses the FM 2894 designation.

FM 2894 was designated on May 6, 1964, from FM 1924, 2.4 miles west of SH 107, north  to FM 2221. On January 25, 2001, FM 2894 was cancelled by district request and redesignated as SH 364.

FM 2895

Farm to Market 2895 (FM 2895) is located in western Webb County.

FM 2895 begins at  SH 359 in the unincorporated community of Aguilares. It runs northward through rural areas of Webb County before ending at  US 59 (Future I-69W). The route has no major intersections between its termini and is two-laned for its entire length.

FM 2895 was designated on May 6, 1964, and it has always ended at SH 359 in Aguilares. The route reached its current length on June 2, 1967, when it was extended to US 59.

FM 2896

FM 2897

FM 2898

FM 2899

Notes

References

+28
Farm to market roads 2800
Farm to Market Roads 2800